Charlemane, a mangy-maned lion, was a hand puppet created and operated by Bil Baird for the CBS's Morning show during the 1950s.

External links
 TV Acres entry

Puppets